William Reid (September 11, 1858 – October 31, 1922) was an American politician, writer, and editor who was a member of the Democratic Party.

Life

William Reid was born on September 11, 1858 in Milwaukee, Wisconsin to Helen Grubb and Thomas Reid and attended public schools. In 1881 he moved to Rawlins, Wyoming Territory and later moved to Cheyenne in 1913. In 1898 he purchased the Carbon County Journal and later purchased the Battle Lake Miner and the Dillion Doublejack. In the 1920s created the Wyoming Democrat which ceased publication after his death.

In 1904 he was elected as Secretary of the Wyoming Democratic Party. In 1913 he was appointed register of the federal land office at Cheyenne by President Woodrow Wilson and served until 1921. On October 31, 1922 he died in Casper, Wyoming.

References

1858 births
1922 deaths
19th-century American newspaper editors
19th-century American newspaper founders
19th-century American newspaper publishers (people)
19th-century American politicians
20th-century American politicians
American male journalists
Politicians from Cheyenne, Wyoming
People from Rawlins, Wyoming
Politicians from Milwaukee
Wyoming Democrats